Myxodes is a genus of clinids found along the Pacific coast of South America from Peru to Chile.

Species
There are currently three recognized species in this genus:
 Myxodes cristatus Valenciennes, 1836 (Sailfin clinid)
 Myxodes ornatus J. S. Stephens & V. G. Springer, 1974
 Myxodes viridis Valenciennes, 1836

References

 
Clinidae
Marine fish genera
Taxa named by Georges Cuvier